The Military Cathedral of Christ's Resurrection was built between 1706 and 1719 as the first stone church in the Lower Don region. It was the main Christian shrine of the Don Cossack Host in the 18th century. It is situated in the stanitsa of Starocherkasskaya (the former city of Cherkassk), Rostov Oblast, Russia.

History 
In 1650, during the siege of Azov, the defending Cossacks vowed to build a wooden cathedral on the square where the cossack leaders held assemblies. Because of frequent fires in Cherkassk (the former name of the town), the cathedral burned twice.

The stone cathedral had been being built from 1706 to 1719. It was constructed in contrary with Peter I's decree banning the construction of stone buildings anywhere except for St. Petersburg. However, in view of political necessity, Peter himself contributed to construction works, helping with money and gifting utensils, and is said to have personally taken a symbolic part in the process of construction, putting a few bricks on the plaster (this fact is stated on the commemorative inscription made, however, already in the 19th century). It is also believed that the main construction works were carried out by architects from Moscow, who were specially sent by the Tsar.

Moreover, it is known (and this information is confirmed by present-day studies of foundation of the cathedral) that the temple was built on a swamp: "Quenched the quagmire with booth and oak forest."

Description 
Resurrection Cathedral has a height of 49 metres. It was built in the Cossack Baroque style by an unknown architect. Near the temple there was also constructed a 48-meter high bell tower.

The interior of the cathedral is striking in its decoration, which appears to be in contrast with the austere exterior. The unique five-tiered gilded iconostasis with the size of 19x23 meter contains 149 icons from the 18th century, which were painted by Moscow iconographer Egor Ivanov Grek.

In front of medium-sized doors of the cathedral there is hanging a copper five-tiered chandelier, which weighs more than 550 kg. It is believed that it was brought in 1643 from the Azov Baptist Church by Ataman Iosif Petrov.

In large semi-circular windows surrounding the Cathedral gallery (the south side of it) used to stand cannons aimed at steppe. When Cherkassk was the capital of Don Cossacks, the storerooms of the cathedral were used to keep the regalia of Cossacks.

Near the entrance to the cathedral one can see walled massive chains, in which was allegedly chained Stepan Razin before he had been sent to be executed. Close to the chains, in the gallery, there is also kept ashes of Ataman Kirill Yakovlev, who treacherously betrayed his godson Stepan to government forces.

Near the cathedral there is a two-tiered bell tower with the height of 45.8 meters. It is the only building of its kind in South Russia.
Currently the bell tower is transferred to Starocherkassk Don monastery.

References

Sources 
 Шадрина А. В. Когда Старочеркасский воскресенский храм стал собором // Донской временник. Год 2016-й / Дон. гос. публ. б-ка. Ростов-на-Дону, 2015. Вып. 24. С. 98-101.
 Кирьянова С. А. Иконописец Егор Грек и иконостас Воскресенского собора Старочеркасска // Донской временник. Год 2016-й / Дон. гос. публ. б-ка. Ростов-на-Дону, 2015. Вып. 24. С. 102-106.

Churches in Rostov Oblast
Russian Orthodox cathedrals in Russia
Churches completed in 1719
Cultural heritage monuments of federal significance in Rostov Oblast